Miu Tin is a village in the North District, in the northwestern New Territories of Hong Kong. The village consists of Sheung Miu Tin and Ha Miu Tin.

Administration
Sheung Miu Tin and Ha Miu Tin are recognized villages under the New Territories Small House Policy.

See also
 Lai Chi Wo

References

External links

 Delineation of area of existing village Miu Tin (Sha Tau Kok) for election of resident representative (2019 to 2022)

Villages in North District, Hong Kong